The 1966 European Rowing Championships were rowing championships held on the Bosbaan in the Dutch city of Amsterdam; the venue had previously been used for the 1954 and 1964 European Rowing Championships. This edition of the European Rowing Championships was for women only and was held from 26 to 28 August. Thirteen countries contested five boat classes (W1x, W2x, W4x+, W4+, W8+), and 39 teams were competing. Two weeks later, men would meet in Bled, Yugoslavia, at the second edition of the World Rowing Championships.

Background
The championships were initially awarded to Romania, but they withdrew. Other countries, including England, were then asked whether they could host the championships instead. With only a few months to go, the decision was made in April 1966 to hold the championships at the Bosbaan, the same venue that was used for the 1964 championships. For the first time since 1955, FISA allowed separate German crews to compete; in the intervening years, East and West Germany had to have selection trials to determine which rowers would start in the various boat classes.

Medal summary – women's events

The 13 countries represented at the Bosbaan were Bulgaria, Great Britain, Czechoslovakia, Denmark, France, Hungary, Italy, Romania, the Soviet Union, Sweden, East Germany, West Germany, and the Netherlands as hosts.

Medals table
For the first time in the history of the European Championships, the East German women were more successful than their Soviet counterparts. Six of those countries won medals, with both East Germany and the Soviet Union winning medals in all five boat classes.

References

European Rowing Championships
European
Rowing
Sports competitions in Amsterdam
European Rowing Championships
Rowing